The , signed as Route 1, is one of the expressway routes of the Hanshin Expressway system serving the Keihanshin area of Japan.

History

In 1964, the first section of the Loop Route and the Hanshin Expressway system opened.

The expressway was popular among street racers in the 1980s, but the illegal activity declined after police began heavily patrolling the route and the stagnation of Japan's economy set in during the Lost Decade.

List of interchanges
The entire expressway lies within Osaka in Osaka Prefecture

In fiction
 In Wangan Midnight Maximum Tune, the Loop Route is a playable course

See also

References

External links

Roads in Osaka Prefecture
1
Ring roads in Japan
1964 establishments in Japan